Gilbert Jackson (c.1595/1600 – after 1648) was an English portrait painter active ca. 1621–1640s.

Never associated with the court, Jackson primarily painted portraits of provincial gentry and members of the professions.  His work period is bracketed  by the signed 1621 portrait of Edward Somerset, 4th Earl of Worcester and the 1643 signed and dated portrait of Chief Justice Sir John Bankes (1643), at Kingston Lacy in Dorset.

Little is known of Jackson's personal life. He likely trained in London under one of the masters of the Jacobean era, and after a career spanning twenty years, was made free of the Painter-Stainers' Company on 16 December 1640.

Works

References

External links 

17th-century English painters
English male painters